Thomas Allison may refer to:

Thomas Allison (explorer), Arctic voyager and diarist
Tommy Allison (1875–1961), Scottish footballer

See also
Allison (surname)
Thomas Allason (1790–1852), British architect